is located in Abashiri and Koshimizu, Hokkaidō, Japan. It takes its name from the Ainu toputsu, or 'mouth of the lake'. A saline lagoon divided from the Sea of Okhotsk by sand dunes, Lake Tōfutsu provides an important habitat for wintering birds. In 2005 an area of 900 ha of wetlands was designated a Ramsar Site.

See also

 Ramsar Sites in Japan

References

Tofutsu
Ramsar sites in Japan
Tofutsu